Ty Cobb (born 1950) is an American lawyer. He was an Assistant U.S. Attorney for the District of Maryland in 1981–86. He has been a partner at Hogan Lovells in Washington, D.C. From July 2017 until May 2018 he was a member of the Trump administration legal team.

Early life
Cobb is the son of Grover C. Cobb, a Kansas radio station owner who was senior executive vice-president of the National Association of Broadcasters (which named one of their prestigious awards for him). Cobb's father was vice-president and general manager of KVGB (AM)/FM in Great Bend, and had a key role in forming the Kansas Association of Broadcasters. Cobb reportedly is a distant relative of the Hall of Fame baseball player bearing the same name. Cobb spent his childhood in Great Bend, Kansas.

Cobb received his A.B. from Harvard University and his J.D. from Georgetown Law School. While at Harvard, Cobb became close friends with Senator Al Franken.

Career
Cobb served as a law clerk for a federal judge, then Assistant U.S. Attorney for the District of Maryland in 1981-86 based in Baltimore as chief of the criminal section and head of the region's drug enforcement and organized crime task force. In 1986, he joined the Baltimore law firm Miles and Stockbridge. Two years later, he joined Hogan & Hartson, which became Hogan Lovells.

Cobb served as special trial counsel during an independent investigation of the Department of Housing and Urban Development in the 1990s.

Cobb successfully defended Hudson Foods against allegations that its executives lied to investigators after a recall of beef tainted with E. coli. The executives were acquitted on all charges. He represented Democratic fundraiser John Huang against campaign finance charges. Huang pleaded guilty in 1999. Other high-profile clients have included Eli Segal, Mary McCarthy, AIG, Office Depot, the House of Saud, IBM, and Medtronic.

Cobb is a Fellow of the American College of Trial Lawyers.

Role in the Special Counsel investigation 

Cobb joined the White House to manage matters related to the ongoing investigations into Russian election interference, starting on July 31, 2017. Cobb was part of the White House internal legal team and reported directly to President Trump. Cobb said that he accepted the White House assignment because "it was an impossible task with a deadline." He elaborated further that he had "rocks in his head and steel balls." Cobb was recommended to Trump by John Dowd, who was a member of his private legal team.

Cobb said that there is no reason to believe that Trump is personally under investigation, and that "They're in full cooperation mode and they've been directed to fully cooperate and get this over with as quickly as possible."

On May 2, 2018, Cobb announced that he was retiring as White House special counsel at the end of the month. He issued a statement that "it has been an honor to serve the country in this capacity at the White House. I wish everybody well moving forward."

Cobb stated on October 22, 2018, that he did not think the Mueller investigation was a "witch hunt." He repeated that assessment in an ABC News interview on March 5, 2019, adding that he thinks Mueller is "an American hero".

In December 2020, Cobb told Peter Nicholas of The Atlantic, "I believed then and now I worked for the country. I didn’t really have any difficulty with that. People's reactions were frequently hostile when they found out what I was doing. How hypocritical is it to think that the Democrats deserve the best people and Republicans don’t? I have served both. It’s the same country."

See also
Timeline of investigations into Trump and Russia (2019)

References

External links
"A Tale of Two Law Firms", Washingtonian, 2011
Who's Who Legal, Law Business Research Ltd, London
"Trial Lawyer Ty Cobb Reflects on 35 Years of Practice", Laws.com

1950 births
20th-century American lawyers
Georgetown University Law Center alumni
Harvard University alumni
Living people
People from Great Bend, Kansas
21st-century American lawyers
Trump administration personnel
Lawyers from Washington, D.C.
Donald Trump litigation
People associated with Hogan Lovells